Glyptorhagada silveriis a species of air-breathing land snails, terrestrial pulmonate gastropod mollusks in the family Camaenidae. This species is endemic to Australia.

References

Gastropods of Australia
silveri
Endangered fauna of Australia
Gastropods described in 1868
Taxa named by George French Angas
Taxonomy articles created by Polbot